Zwingenberg Castle, also called Zwingenberg or Schloss Zwingenberg, stands on the right bank of the River Neckar where it cuts through the Odenwald hills in central Germany. The castle is located in the municipality of Zwingenberg in the state of Baden-Württemberg.

Location 
The spur castle was built on a hill spur in the triangle formed by the confluence of the steep Wolfschlucht gorge with the Neckar valley and lies about 50 metres above the river.

History 
The castle was probably built in the 13th century by the Hohenstaufen ministerialis, William of Wimpfen. The first record of it dates to the year 1326. A nephew of William of Wimpfen called himself von Zwingenberg. Because the Zwingenbergs were robber knights, in 1363 they were driven from the castle and it was slighted in the name of the emperor. In 1403, the Lord of Hirschhorn was enfeoffed with the Zwingenberg and had it rebuilt. After his line had died out, ownership switched between the Electorate of Mainz, Electorate of the Palatinate and the Grand Duchy of Baden. The lord of the castle today is Louis (Ludwig), Prince of Baden (born 1937), a descendant of Grand Duke Charles Frederick of Baden.

Above Zwingenberg Castle are the remains of Fürstenstein Castle.

Literature 
 Jochen Pressler: Burgen und Schlösser im Rhein-Neckar-Dreieck. Alles Wissenswerte über 126 Burg- und Schloßanlagen in Nordbaden, Südhessen und der Vorderen Pfalz. 3rd expanded and revised edition. Schimper, Schwetzingen, 1996, . pp. 98f
 Jochen Goetze (text) and Werner Richner (photography): Burgen im Neckartal. Braus, Heidelberg, 1989, . pp. 44ff
 Heinrich Niester: Die Instandsetzungsarbeiten auf der Burg Zwingenberg am Neckar, Rhein-Neckar-Kreis. In: Denkmalpflege in Baden-Württemberg, 2nd annual, 1973, Issue 2, p. 18–27. (pdf; 9.2 MB)

External links 

Official website of the Zwingenberg Schloss
Official website of the Schloss Festival, Zwingenberg
Zwingenberg Castle at burgenwelt.de
Schloss Zwingenberg on a private website
Entry at Krieger
Zwingenberg Castle at Schlösser und Burgen in Baden-Württemberg

Odenwald